Peter Patterson may refer to:

 Peter Patterson (politician) (1825–1904), Ontario businessman and political figure
 Peter Patterson (footballer) (born 1945), former Australian rules footballer
 Peter Patterson (businessman) (1768–1851), English-born businessman and seigneur in Quebec
 Pete Patterson (born 1957), American alpine ski racer

See also
Peter Paterson (disambiguation)